Gerdekan Kureh (also Romanized as Gerdekān Kūreh; also known as Gerdekānkūr-e Shahbāz) is a village in Qalkhani Rural District, Gahvareh District, Dalahu County, Kermanshah Province, Iran. At the 2006 census, its population was 297, in 54 families.

References 

Populated places in Dalahu County